Steve Cain (born 12 December 1958) is a New Zealand professional soccer coach.

Career
In 2002, he was a head coach of the Papua New Guinea national football team. Also he coached the Waitakere United and New Zealand U17.

References

External links

1958 births
Living people
New Zealand association football coaches
Expatriate football managers in Papua New Guinea
Papua New Guinea national football team managers
Place of birth missing (living people)
Waitakere United managers